Gentiluomo International BV is a 100 per cent Dutch owned and managed men’s fashion company based in the Netherlands. The brand Gentiluomo originates from the Second Group and was founded in 1993 in Amsterdam. 
The company started as a men's business shirt maker.

History 

In 1995 the collection developed into a total look concept. Gentiluomo range includes suits, jackets, coats, shirts, knitwear and accessories. The brand is positioned in the commercial segment of high end market and sold at department stores and individual retailers in the Netherlands and Belgium. 

In the year 2004 Gentiluomo International became independent through a management buy out. In the same year a new brand, named Genti was developed and introduced. In 2009 Gentiluomo International BV opened its first VIEW store in the Southern part of the Netherlands. In 2014 another new VIEW store was opened.

References 

Dutch fashion brand Gentiluomo new supplier PSV (27-05-2010) http://www.psv.nl/psv/video/video/gentiluomo-nieuwe-kledingsupplier-van-psv.htm

Clothing companies of the Netherlands